Lilu Wang, stage name Hsiao Man, is a Taiwanese singer and actress. She was formerly in the girl band Hey Girl and currently works as a model in Eelin Modelling Agency.

Biography
Suan Wang was in a group originally known as Hei Se Hui Mei Mei which underwent a name change to Hey Girl. Hey Girl consisted of seven other girls, and they are known to work with another popular Taiwanese boy band, Lollipop, which consists of six boys.
 
On 17 March 2010, Hsiao Man announced that she left Hey Girl to pursue her career as a model in Eelin Modelling Agency.

In 2010, Hsiao Man, along with the five other top models who turned 21 years old, established Cute Girl and released their first album, Cute Fantasy.

Drama

TV Show Theme Songs 
Lollipop & Hey Girl – Ku Cha, Brown Sugar Macchiato (2007)
Hey Girl – Hello Ai Qing Feng, Brown Sugar Macchiato (2007)
Lollipop & Hey Girl – Hei Tang Xiu, Brown Sugar Macchiato (2007)

References

1989 births
Living people
21st-century Taiwanese actresses
21st-century Taiwanese singers
Taiwanese television actresses
Actresses from Taipei
Musicians from Taipei
21st-century Taiwanese women singers